The cabinet of Yemeni prime minister Mohammed Basindawa was sworn in on 10 December 2011.  Basindwa was appointed on 28 November 2011 by  Vice President Abdo Rabbo Mansour Hadi.  It was made up 35 ministers – mostly from the General People Congress (GPC) and its allies and the Joint Meeting Parties (JMP) and its partners.

List of ministers

See also 

 Politics of Yemen

References 

Cabinets of Yemen
Basindawa Cabinet
2011 establishments in Yemen